Tse-whit-zen (č̕ixʷícən  in the Klallam language, meaning "inner harbor") is a 1,700- to 2,700-year-old village of the Lower Elwha Klallam Tribe located along the Port Angeles, Washington waterfront. It is located at the base of Ediz Hook on the Olympic Peninsula. During construction in August 2003 of a graving dock associated with replacement of the Hood Canal Bridge, the village's cemetery and other prehistoric remains were discovered. The construction project was abandoned at this site because of the importance of the find, as the village was intact. It is the largest pre-European contact village site excavated in Washington State.

Archaeological excavation has revealed more than 10,000 artifacts and more than 335 intact skeletons. The Washington State Department of Transportation decided to halt all construction efforts related to the graving dock on December 21, 2004. Since then it has worked to ensure the preservation of remains and artifacts already uncovered by the construction. 

As a result of a legal settlement with Washington State, the tribe received the land of the village site, as well as $2.5 million to build a cultural center or museum at the site. The tribe intended to begin construction around 2012.

History
The Lower Elwha Klallam Tribe occupied the village of Tse-whit-zen for more than 2,700 years, according to radiocarbon dating. Their territory extended from this area along the Hoko River on the Strait of Juan de Fuca into the present-day Hood Canal, and this was one of several villages throughout the area. The earliest confirmed settlement at the village site dates to 750 B.C., about the same time as the founding of Rome, Italy.

This village site, which includes longhouse areas, ceremonial areas, places for fish and clam drying, was occupied by the Klallam until the 1930s. During the early 20th century, businesses owned by European Americans built a number of lumber mills on top of the village site at the waterfront during the expansion of the lumber industry.

Archaeological excavation has revealed possibly eight long house structures.

Elder Adeline Smith of the Lower Elwha Klallam Tribe championed the preservation of Tse-whit-zen. As a child, Smith had been warned by adults never to walk on or play on the site of Tse-whit-zen, as it was considered sacred by her people. She was also instrumental in gaining removal of the Elwha Dam and contributing to preservation of the Klallam language through creating a dictionary and written form.

The site is the largest ancient (pre-contact) Native American village discovered in Washington state to date (as of 2013).

References

Further reading
 
Lynda V. Mapes, "State Ends Transportation Project on Ancient Tribal Site," The Seattle Times, December 22, 2004 (http://archives.seattletimes.nwsource.com); 
Mapes, "Buried Past Comes Alive" and "From Tools, Shells and Bones, A Culture Emerges," May 22, 2005, Ibid.; *Mapes, "‘How Could So Many Die?' Graves May Tell Story of Terrible Epidemic," May 23, 2005, Ibid.; 
Mapes, "Site Teaching Klallam Tribe ‘Who We Were, Who We Are'" May 25, 2005 Ibid.; 
"Culture & History," Lower Elwha Klallam Tribe website accessed May 27, 2005 (http://www.elwha.org/Culture1.htm); 
Frances Charles, "One Tribe's Story of Discovery, Conflict and Heartache," Lower Elwha Klallam Tribe Tse-Whit-Zen Village News website accessed May 27, 2005 (http://tse-whit-zen.elwha.nsn.us); 
John Loftus, "At Tse-whit-zen with the Lower Elwha Klallam People," Ibid.; 
"SR 104, Hood Canal Bridge -- Frequently Asked Questions," Washington State Department of Transportation website accessed June 1, 2005 (http://www.wsdot.wa.gov/Projects/ SR104HoodCanalBridgeEast/faq.htm); 
Robert H. Ruby and John Arthur Brown, A Guide to the Indian Tribes of the Pacific Northwest (Norman: University of Oklahoma Press, 1986), 26-28, 106-07; 
David Wilma and Kit Oldham, "Department of Transportation Abandons Hood Canal Bridge Graving Dock Project Located on Site of Klallam Indian Village and Cemetery on December 21, 2004", Online Encyclopedia of Washington State History (accessed June 13, 2005).

External links
"Lower Elwha Klallam tribe"
"Unearthing Tse-whit-zen", Seattle Times 
"Washington: Construction of the Port Angeles Graving Dock", Advisory Council on Historic Preservation
Port Angeles Graving Dock Report, WSDOT
Review of Port Angeles Graving Dock Project - Transportation Performance Audit Board (pdf file), 2006

Native American history of Washington (state)
Klallam
Archaeological sites in Washington (state)
Buildings and structures in Clallam County, Washington